Koruni may refer to:
 Koruni, Kazerun
 Koruni, Marvdasht
 Koruni, Shiraz